Richard Nelson Corliss (March 6, 1944 – April 23, 2015) was an American film critic and magazine editor for Time. He focused on movies, with occasional articles on other subjects.

He was the former editor-in-chief of Film Comment and authored several books including Talking Pictures, which, along with other publications, drew early attention to the screenwriter, as opposed to the director.

Personal life and background
Corliss was born in 1944 in Philadelphia, Pennsylvania, the son of Elizabeth Brown (née McCluskey) and Paul William Corliss. He attended St. Joseph's College, Philadelphia (now Saint Joseph's University), obtaining a bachelor's degree, before progressing to Columbia University to earn a master's degree in film studies. Corliss resided in New York City with his wife, Mary, whom he married on Sunday, August 31, 1969. Mary was formerly a curator in the Film Stills Archive of the Museum of Modern Art.

In a 1990 article, Corliss mentions his mother clipping movie ads with quotes of his and posting them to her refrigerator door.

On April 23, 2015, Corliss died under hospice care in New York City after suffering a stroke.

Career
Corliss wrote for many magazines—National Review from 1966 to 1970, New Times, Maclean's and SoHo Weekly News in 1980. At Film Comment, Corliss helped draw attention to the screenwriter in the creation of movies. Corliss challenged Andrew Sarris's idea of the Director as author or auteur of this work. Corliss was one of Sarris' students at New York University (NYU); the two remained friends until Sarris' death.

Corliss brought Jonathan Rosenbaum to Film Comment as a Paris correspondent. Despite working for National Review, a conservative magazine, Corliss was a self-described "liberal". In 1980, Corliss joined Time. Although he started as an associate editor, he was promoted to senior writer by 1985.

Corliss wrote for time.com as well as the print magazine including a retired column about nostalgic pop culture called That Old Feeling. He wrote occasional articles for Time. He was an occasional guest on Charlie Rose's talk show commenting on new releases, mostly during the 1990s with Janet Maslin and David Denby. His last appearance on the show was in December 2005 to talk about the year in film. Corliss also appeared on A&E Biography to talk about the life and work of Jackie Chan, and appeared in Richard Schickel's documentary about Warner Brothers.

Corliss attended the Cannes Film Festival along with Roger Ebert and Todd McCarthy for the longest period of any US journalist. He also attended festivals in Toronto and Venice. Corliss used to work on the board of the New York Film Festival, but resigned in 1987 after longtime head Richard Roud was fired due to his challenging of editorial direction of the festival.

Lolita, Corliss's third book, was a study of Vladimir Nabokov's book and Stanley Kubrick's film. Later Corliss has written an introductory essay for Crouching Tiger, Hidden Dragon: A Portrait of the Ang Lee Film.

Corliss also admired the Pixar movies, including listing Finding Nemo as one of his and fellow Time critic Richard Schickel's 100 all-time greatest movies. With recent Pixar releases Cars and Ratatouille Corliss had access into the studio's inner workings. Pixar director Brad Bird has said of critics in general that he has "got nothing against critics." He also that he had "done very well with them, over the years."

In addition to writing for Time, Corliss had a lengthy association with Film Comment magazine, serving as its editor from 1970 to 1990. Corliss covered movies for the magazine and for time.com simultaneously. Corliss along with Martin Scorsese first came up with the idea for the issue on "guilty pleasures".

Corliss along with Richard Schickel made a 100 Greatest movies list. Corliss alone created lists of the 25 greatest villains, the 25 best horror films, and the 25 most important films on race. In addition Corliss was on the 2001 jury for AFI's 100 Greatest movies list. In a 1993 Time magazine movie review of The Crying Game, Corliss subtly gave away the spoiler of the film, by spelling it out with the first letters of each paragraph of his review.

In the 2012 Sight & Sound poll, Corliss cast votes for Chungking Express, Citizen Kane, Historie(s) du Cinema, The Lady Eve, Mouchette, Pyaasa, The Searchers, The Seventh Seal and WALL-E.

Conflict and criticism
Corliss was critical of the escalating expenditure on action films, writing in his review of Terminator 2: Judgment Day (1991) that "the cost of the product is not passed on to the consumer. Moviegoers pay as much for a ticket to a no-budget documentary like Paris Is Burning (1990) as they do for admission to any superspectacle."

Corliss had movies on his top ten lists that fellow Time critic Richard Schickel rated the worst of the year. These included 2001's Moulin Rouge!, 2003's Cold Mountain and 2004's Eternal Sunshine of the Spotless Mind. In August 2004, Stephen King, criticizing what he saw as a growing trend of leniency towards films by critics, included Corliss among a number of "formerly reliable critics who seem to have gone remarkably soft – not to say softhearted and sometimes softheaded – in their old age."

Corliss appears in the 2009 documentary film For the Love of Movies: The Story of American Film Criticism, confessing that he was the film critic who, in the 1970s, coined the term "Paulettes" for the ardent followers of Pauline Kael, a label which has stuck.

Corliss criticized Siskel and Ebert in his Film Comment article, "All Thumbs?: Or, Is There a Future For Film Criticism?", and Ebert responded with "All Stars: Or Is There a Cure For Criticism?" Corliss praised Ebert in a June 23, 2007 article "Thumbs up for Roger Ebert." Corliss's dialogue with Ebert in Film Comment was reprinted in Ebert's Awake in the Dark: The Best of Roger Ebert. Corliss appeared in the Ebert documentary Life Itself, where he praised Ebert's "polymathic genius."

Number Ones from Corliss' Top-Tens 
Best English language film in parentheses:
1969: Midnight Cowboy
1980: Mon Oncle d'Amerique (The Elephant Man)
1981: The Mystery of Oberwald (Thief)
1982: E.T. the Extra-Terrestrial
1983: Berlin Alexanderplatz (The Big Chill)
1986: The Fly
1988: The Singing Detective
1989: Distant Voices, Still Lives
1990: L'Atalante (re-release) (Internal Affairs)
1991: My Father's Glory and My Mother's Castle (The Simpsons: Lisa's Substitute)
1992: The Simpsons: Black Widower
1993: The Age of Innocence
1994: Pulp Fiction
1995: Persuasion
1997: Ponette (Chasing Amy)
2001: Kandahar (Moulin Rouge!)
2002: Talk to Her (Gangs of New York)
2003: Lord of the Rings: The Return of the King
2004: Hero and House of Flying Daggers (Sideways)
2005: The White Diamond (The Squid and the Whale)
2006: Pan's Labyrinth (Borat)
2007: No Country For Old Men
2008: WALL-E
2009: The Princess and the Frog
2010: Toy Story 3
2011: The Artist (Hugo in second place)
2012: Amour (Beasts of the Southern Wild)
2013: Gravity
2014: The Grand Budapest Hotel

Bibliography

Books

Greta Garbo (1974)
Lolita (1995)
Mom in the Movies: The Iconic Screen Mothers You Love (and a Few You Love to Hate) (2014)

Articles

References

External links

In Memoriam – Time Magazine
Biography – from Allmovie
Corliss's Top Ten Picks – a yearly breakdown of Corliss's favorite movies.
Top 100 Movies Ever – Corliss and fellow Time critic Richard Schickel's list of the greatest movies ever made
 Richard Corliss, 1944-2015: Everywhere At Once by Matt Zoller Seitz, Editor-in-Chief, RogerEbert.com

1944 births
2015 deaths
American film critics
National Society of Film Critics Members
American magazine editors
Columbia University School of the Arts alumni
Saint Joseph's University alumni
Writers from Philadelphia
Time (magazine) people
American male journalists
20th-century American non-fiction writers
21st-century American non-fiction writers
20th-century American male writers
21st-century American male writers